Lisa Trutkoff Trumbauer, often known as Lisa Trumbauer, (born February 15, 1963) is an American author of children's books.

Early life and education 
Trumbauer was born in The Bronx, New York City, on February 15, 1963, to Fred and Sigrid Trutkoff. She earned a bachelor's degree from the University of Maryland.

Selected publications

 Dungeons & Dragons novel Hidden Dragon (June 2005)
 A Practical Guide to Vampires, Mirrorstone Books, 2009, ISBN 9780786952434
 Mystery of Canyon Creek
 A Practical Guide to Dragons
 Has Anyone Seen My Green Dinosaur 
 I Swear I Saw a Witch in Washington
 A Practical Guide to Dragon Riding, Mirrorstone Books

Personal life 
Trumbauer is married and lives in New Jersey.

References

1963 births
21st-century American novelists
21st-century American women writers
American women novelists
Living people
Place of birth missing (living people)
Women science fiction and fantasy writers
Writers from New York City